The 2018–19 Champions Hockey League was the fifth season of the Champions Hockey League, a European ice hockey tournament. The tournament was competed by 32 teams, and qualification was on sporting merits only. The six founding leagues were represented by between three and five teams (based on a four-year league ranking), while seven "challenge leagues" were represented by one team each. One place was awarded to the Continental Cup champion. Unlike in the first three editions, founding teams did not automatically qualify. The group stages began on 30 August 2018, and ended on 17 October 2018. The season had an average attendance of 3,401 per game, one percent increase from the previous season.

Swedish team Frölunda HC won their third Champions Hockey League title, defeating Red Bull München, the first German team to reach the final, 3–1 at the Scandinavium in Gothenburg.

Team allocation
A total of 32 teams from different European first-tier leagues participated in the 2018–19 Champions Hockey League. Besides the Continental Cup champions, 24 teams from the six founding leagues, as well as the national champions from Slovakia, Norway, Denmark, France, Belarus, the United Kingdom and Poland qualified.

The qualification for these places was set out in the rules as follows:
 National league champion (play-off winners)
 Regular season winners
 Regular season runner-up
 Losing play-off finalist
 Higher regular season ranked losing semi-finalist
 Lower regular season ranked losing semi-finalist
 Third placed team in regular season
 Fourth placed team in regular season
 Fifth placed team in regular season.

Teams

Group stage

For the group stage, the teams were drawn into 8 groups of 4 teams. Each team played home and away against every other team for a total of 6 games. The best 2 teams qualified to the round of 16.

Pots
As the reigning CHL champions, JYP were the top seeded team. In the top pot were also the reigning champions of the six founding leagues and the regular season winner of SHL. The 16 remaining teams from founding leagues were placed to pots 2 and 3. The fourth pot included playoff champions of seven challenge leagues and Yunost Minsk, the champion of 2017–18 IIHF Continental Cup.

Group stage tie-breaking criteria
If two teams were tied in points after the group stage was finished, the teams precedence was decided by head-to-head games. If teams were tied after that, then the team which was ranked higher prior to the tournament took precedence. When comparing head-to-head results, the following criteria were applied:

 more points in games against the other tied team
 better goal difference in games against the other tied team
 more goals scored against the other tied team
 more goals scored in a single game against the other tied team
 overtime wins against the other tied team
 more goals scored in the two game winning shot competitions
 higher position in the 2017–18 CHL club ranking

Group A

Group B

Group C

Group D

Group E

Group F

Group G

Group H

Playoffs

Qualified teams

Format 

In each round except the final, the teams played two games and the aggregate score decided the team which advanced. As a rule, the first leg was hosted by the team who had the inferior record in the tournament to that point and the second leg was played on the home ice of the other team. If aggregate score was tied, a sudden death overtime followed. If the overtime is scoreless, the team who wins the game winning shot competition advanced.

The final was played on the home ice of the team who had the better record in the tournament on 5 February 2019.

Bracket 

The eight group winners and the eight second-placed teams advanced to the Round of 16. The teams were divided into two seeding groups and group winners were randomly drawn against runners-up. Teams who had faced each other in the group stage could not be drawn against each other in the round of 16. The draw took place in Helsinki, Finland on 19 October 2018.

Note:
The teams listed on top of each tie were runners up in the group stage and play the first leg at home. The bottom team were group winners and play the second leg at home. The Malmö Redhawks, however, ended up playing their first leg at home due to their arena being reserved on 20 November.
The order of the legs (which team starts at home) in the future rounds may be changed as the team with the best record should have the second game at home.

Final

Statistics

Scoring leaders
The following players led the league in points.

Leading goaltenders
The following goaltenders led the league in save percentage, provided that they have played at least 40% of their team's minutes.

References

External links

2018
Champions